The 2nd Gemini Awards were held on December 8, 1987, to honour achievements in Canadian television. It was broadcast on CBC.

Awards

Best Comedy Program or Series
 Seeing Things
 Hangin' In

Best Dramatic Series
 Night Heat
 Red Serge
 Street Legal

Best Dramatic Mini Series
 Ford: The Man and the Machine
 Sword of Gideon

Best Information Program or Series
 The Journal
 Midday
 The Fifth Estate
 W5

Best Children's Series
 Degrassi Junior High
 Fraggle Rock
 Spirit Bay
 What's New?

Best Writing in a Dramatic Program
 Night Heat
 Street Legal
 The Beachcombers
 The Campbells

Best Writing in a Comedy or Variety Program or Series
 The S and M Comic Book
 Fraggle Rock
 Seeing Things

Best Direction in a Dramatic Series or Comedy Series
 Degrassi Junior High
 Danger Bay
 Seeing Things
 Street Legal
 The Campbells

Best Performance by an Actor in a Continuing Role in a Comedy Series
 Louis Del Grande, Seeing Things
 David Eisner, Hangin' In

Best Performance by a Lead Actress in a Continuing Role in a Comedy Series
 Dinah Christie, Check it Out
 Lally Cadeau, Hangin' In
 Martha Gibson, Seeing Things
 Janet-Laine Green, Seeing Things

Best Performance by a Lead Actor in a Continuing Dramatic Series
 Winston Rekert, Adderly
 Scott Hylands, Night Heat
 Pat Mastroianni, Degrassi Junior High
 Eric Peterson, Street Legal
 Allan Royal, Night Heat

Best Performance by a Lead Actress in a Continuing Dramatic Series
 Dixie Seatle, Adderly
 Stacie Mistysyn, Degrassi Junior High
 Nicole Stoffman, Degrassi Junior High
 Amber-Lea Weston, The Campbells

Best Performance by a Broadcast Journalist
 Joe Schlesinger
 Hana Gartner
 Eric Malling
 Terence McKenna

Earle Grey Award
 Lorne Greene

02
Gemini Awards, 1987
Gemini Awards, 1987